The 2018 Big Ten Conference baseball tournament was held at TD Ameritrade Park Omaha in Omaha, Nebraska, from May 23 through 27. The event aired on the Big Ten Network. The event was held in Bloomington for one year before returning to Omaha, Nebraska, site of the College World Series.

Format and seeding
The 2018 tournament was an 8 team double-elimination tournament. The top eight teams based on conference regular season winning percentage earned invites to the tournament. The teams then played a double-elimination tournament leading to a single championship game.

Bracket

References

Tournament
Big Ten Baseball Tournament
Big Ten baseball tournament
Big Ten baseball tournament